Tomato aspermy virus (TAV) is a plant pathogenic virus of the family Bromoviridae.

External links
 
 

Bromoviridae
Viral plant pathogens and diseases